Příbor is a town in Nový Jičín District in the Moravian-Silesian Region of the Czech Republic. It has about 8,300 inhabitants. The historic centre of Příbor is well preserved and is protected by law as an urban monument reservation.

Administrative parts

Villages of Hájov and Prchalov are administrative parts of Příbor.

Etymology
Although the name of the town literally means "cutlery", it is just a coincidence. It is not certain whether the Czech name Příbor originated earlier and the German name Freiberg was derived by transcription, or vice versa. If the Czech name is older, it was probably derived from při boru or při zboru, meaning "at a pine forest" / "at a ruin". If the German name is older, Freiberg means "free castle" or "castle with free access". Some German language maps from the 19th century identify Příbor as Freyberg.

Geography
The town is located in the Moravian-Silesian Foothills on the Lubina River.

History
The town of Příbor was founded by Count Frank von Hückeswagen in 1251, which was confirmed in a deed of Moravian margrave Ottokar II from the same year, where the town was called Vriburch. The town square was founded right on an old trade route to Poland.

The count built here a solid castle. His descendants owned the town until 1359, when Příbor passed to the Bishops of Olomouc. The bishops liked the town, especially Franz von Dietrichstein, who granted it a number of privileges. During the Thirty Years' War, the town burned down three times. The most destructive was the invasion of Swedes in 1643. In the second half of the 17th century, the town recovered.

In 1694, a Piarist gymnasium was established and education was also available to the poorer people. Příbor developed to an important centre of education. From 1875 to 1938, the Czech Teacher Institute operated here, from which a number of significant pedagogues and experts in education and culture came.

Demographics

Sights

Příbor is one of the oldest towns in the region. The historic centre is formed by a regular town square lined with burgher houses, which are mainly Renaissance with Baroque alterations.

The Piarist monastery was founded here in 1694 by Karl II von Liechtenstein-Kastelkorn. It is a Baroque three-wing single-storey building. Today it houses the town museum, a library and an elementary art school.

There are four churches in the town. The most important is the Romanesque-Gothic parish Church of the Nativity of the Virgin Mary with later Renaissance and Baroque adaptations. The church was founded together with the town, the current brick building dates from the 14th century. It is a very rugged building with a number of elements added later, dominated by a slender tall tower. The interior contains valuable rococo furniture.

Other churches in the historic centre are the Church of the Holy Cross and the former Piarist Church of Saint Valentine. Outside the historic centre is located the Church of Saint Francis of Assisi.

The birthplace of Sigmund Freud is now a museum with an exhibition about his life and work.

Notable people
Jan Sarkander (1576–1620), Polish-Czech priest and saint; lived and studied here in 1589–1597
Antonín Cyril Stojan (1851–1923), Archbishop of Olomouc; studied here and worked here as chaplain
Sigmund Freud (1856–1939), Austrian neurologist and the founder of psychoanalysis

Twin towns – sister cities

Příbor is twinned with:
 Przedbórz, Poland

References

External links

Cities and towns in the Czech Republic
Populated places in Nový Jičín District